The 2021–22 season was the 97th season in the existence of FC Zenit Saint Petersburg and the club's 26th consecutive season in the top flight of Russian football. In addition to the domestic league, Zenit Saint Petersburg are participating in this season's editions of the Russian Cup, the Russian Super Cup and the UEFA Champions League.

Season events
On 3 June, Zenit announced the permanent signing of Dmitri Chistyakov from Rostov on a four-year contract.

On 19 July, Emanuel Mammana returned to Sochi on loan for the season. Two days later, 21 July, Daniil Shamkin left the club to join Baltika Kaliningrad on a season-long loan deal.

On 26 July, Sebastián Driussi bought out the remaining year of his contract with Zenit St.Petersburg, and left the club.

On 13 August, Zenit announced the permanent signing of Claudinho from Red Bull Bragantino on a five-year contract.

On 2 September, Zenit announced the signing of Stanislav Kritsyuk to a one-year contract, with the option of an additional year, from Gil Vicente. The following day, 3 September, Zenit announced that they had extended their contract with Brazilian defender Douglas Santos until the end of the 2025/26 season.

On 19 October, Wilmar Barrios extended his contract with Zenit until the end of the 2025–26 season.

On 7 January, Emanuel Mammana and Zenit agreed to mutual terminate his contract and he left the club.

On 10 January, Zenit announced the signing of Ivan Sergeyev from Krylia Sovetov with a contract until the end of the 2024/25 season. On the same day, Aleksandr Vasyutin extended his loan deal with Djurgårdens IF for the 2022 season.

In January 2022, Nuraly Alip joined up with Zenit for a trial during their week long training camp in the United Arab Emirates.

On 25 January, Zenit announced the signing of Arsen Adamov from Ural Yekaterinburg on a contract until the end of 2025–26 season.

On 30 January, Zenit announced that Sardar Azmoun had left the club to sign for Bayer Leverkusen, and that they had signed Yuri Alberto to a five-year contract from Internacional.

On 10 February, Danila Khotulyov and Dmitri Vasilyev both joined Orenburg on loan until the end of the 2022/23 season.

On 16 February, Zenit announced that they'd signed Nuraly Alip on loan from Kairat for the remainder of the season, with an option to make the move permanent.

On 2 March, Yaroslav Rakitskyi left Zenit by mutual consent.

On 7 April, Zenit extended their contract with Aleksandr Yerokhin until the summer of 2024, and with Aleksei Sutormin until the summer of 2025.

Squad

Out on loan

Transfers

In

Loans in

Out

Loans out

Released

Trial

Contract renewals

Friendlies

Competitions

Overall record

Super Cup

Premier League

League table

Results summary

Results by round

Results

Russian Cup

UEFA Champions League

The draw for the UEFA Champions League group stage was held on 26 August, drawing Zenit with Chelsea, Juventus and Malmö.

Group stage

UEFA Europa League

Knockout phase

Knockout round play-offs
The knockout round play-offs draw was held on 13 December 2021.

Squad statistics

Appearances and goals

|-
|colspan="16"|Players away from the club on loan:

|-
|colspan="16"|Players who left Zenit during the season:

|}

Goal scorers

Clean sheets

Disciplinary record

References

External links
  

FC Zenit Saint Petersburg seasons
Zenit Saint Petersburg
Zenit
Zenit
Russian football championship-winning seasons